Salisbury Station is a pastoral lease that operates as a sheep station in the outback of New South Wales.

The country is composed of sand dunes interspersed with clay pans. Areas of mulga are found on the property as are open downs of cottonbush and saltbush with areas of Queensland blue and Mitchell grasses. Stock can be watered by a large number of smaller ephemeral creeks and Altiboulka Lake which receives floodwaters from the Bulloo River.

History
Established at some time prior to 1881, it was owned by Lockhart Morton, with 1,000 ewes being stolen from the property the same year. The properties were stocked with 5,000 ewes and lambs, the homestead at Salisbury, kitchen, stores and some fencing.

A bore was sunk along a stock route on the station boundary with Yantara in 1895. The route was regarded as the driest in the country.

The property occupied an area of over 1 million acres in 1901 and was managed by T. Welsh who had been at the property for 16 years, the owner of the property was William Taylor.

Sidney Kidman acquired the property in 1914 along with nearby Bootra in 1915. Both stations were carrying sheep and cattle and were being managed from Bootra. By 1924 the area was being plagued by dingos, Salisbury had been carrying flocks of up to 80,000 sheep but since the pest arrived numbers had dropped substantially.

In 1936 the property occupied an area of  when it was sold by the estate of Sidney Kidman to Elsinore Limited.

See also
List of ranches and stations

References

Stations (Australian agriculture)
Pastoral leases in New South Wales
Localities in New South Wales
Far West (New South Wales)